USS Palm Beach (AGER-3) was a former Army Auxiliary Aircraft Repair Ship converted to an electronic and signals intelligence ship of the United States Navy.

Service history 
She was laid down as FS-217 one of the 18 specialized Design 427 variants of the Army Freight and Supply type, officially Vessel, Supply, Aircraft Repair, Diesel, Steel, 180', at Higgins Industries in New Orleans. FS-217 was delivered to the US Army Transportation Corps operation under technical control of the United States Army Air Forces in December 1944. At some point, after delivery, the Army Air Forces named the repair vessels with FS-217 being named Colonel Armond Peterson. The ship was first based in San Francisco, but later engaged in coastal surveys off the Lesser Antilles and coast of Central America. The ship was based at Balboa, Canal Zone before being placed in reserve status on 17 February 1956.

Colonel Armond Peterson was acquired and converted by the United States Navy and redesignated as Light Cargo Ship Palm Beach (AKL-45) on 18 June 1966. She was converted to a Banner class environmental research ship at Puget Sound Naval Shipyard and reclassified as AGER-3. The Palm Beach was commissioned on 13 October 1967 and served two years as an ELINT/SIGINT ship, deploying in the Mediterranean and in the North Sea. She was decommissioned and later struck on 1 December 1969.  She was sold to a private owner, then resold to a Panamanian company and renamed MV Oro Verde. The ship was eventually involved in drug smuggling and ran aground in the Cayman Islands. She was sunk by the Cayman Islands government as a SCUBA dive wreck.

Footnotes

References

Bibliography

1944 ships
Cold War auxiliary ships of the United States
Ships of the United States Army
Design 427 coastal freighters
Banner-class environmental research ships